is a Japanese gravure idol and actress.

Life and career
Kijima was born in Nagano Prefecture, Japan on March 22, 1988. She was one of the winners at the 2005 Seikore competition, short for Zenkoku Joshikousei Seifuku Collection, a Japanese national contest for girls of high school age to model school uniforms and bikinis. She has since made a number of gravure videos.

In May 2006, at age eighteen, she appeared in Masato Tsujioka's award-winning film Divide. That same year saw her playing a literal "living doll" in the Tetsuya Ikea produced Legend of the Doll. The Crystal Acids reviewer notes "The acting is fairly solid ... with Noriko Kijima proving that she is more than just a pretty face." She also played the role of Yoshie, Ami's best friend, in Noboru Iguchi's 2008 cult gore film The Machine Girl and was the star of the short direct-to-video sequel Shyness Machine Girl.

Along with actresses Noriko Eguchi and Saori Hara she appeared in the comedy , which debuted at the Yubari International Fantastic Film Festival in February 2010 and was released theatrically in May of that same year. At a press conference in January 2012, it was announced that Kijima, along with Rika Sakurai and Miki Ichikawa had taken the Grand Prize as "Miss East Sports 2012" (}. In March 2013, she co-starred with Hiroko Kamata and Maki Fukumi in the lesbian-themed movie , the title referring to the online "handles" of the three girls who go on a trip to a hot springs.

The July 2014 light S&M comedy with lesbian overtones, The Torture Club, is described by critic Derek Elley as a "star vehicle" for Kijima and as a lead-in for the schoolgirls vs. zombies Z ~Zed~, also released in July 2014.

Filmography
Theatrical releases
 Divide (DIVIDE　ディバイド) May 2006
 The Machine Girl (片腕マシンガール The Machine Girl) August 2008
 Pyocotan Profile (ピョコタン・プロファイル) November 2008
 Samurai Princess (サムライプリンセス 外道姫) June 2009
 Yuriko's Aroma (ユリ子のアロマ) February 2010
  March 2013
  July 2014
 Z ~Zed~ July 2014
 The Cornered Mouse Dreams of Cheese (TBA)

Direct-to-video (V-Cinema)
 Legend of the Doll (萌えキュン＠MOVIE 聖・美少女フィギュア伝) 2006
 Shyness Machine Girl (hajiraiマシンガール) 2009

Television
Hana Moyu 2015

DVD appearances
Gravure videos.
 Abunai Kyujitsu December 2005 (with Megumi Koga)
 Angel Kiss (June 2006)
 GO!! GO!! Seijun School Five August 2006 (with 4 other models)
 Angel Kiss Norinori Panic 2 September 2006
 Tamayura November 2006 (with Yuki Suzuki)
 Gekisha Vol.20 Noriko Kijima December 2006
 Rinkai March 2007
 Norinori Dream May 2007
 Angel Kiss - Nori Nori Vacances December 2007
 Mitsumeteitai July 2008
 Mitsumetehoshii October 2008
 Yuwaku Temptation November 2008
 Noriko no Michi March 2009
 Sweet Heart July 2010
 Warunori February 2011
 Moso Honey July 2011
 Hadakano Mermaid December 2011
 Eden June 2012
 Kinjirareta Asobi February 2013

Notes

External links
 Noriko Kijima's Official Agency 
 Noriko Kijima's Official Blog (Oct'2014 - Present 
 Noriko Kijima's Official Blog (Feb'2010 - Oct'2014) 
 Noriko Kijima's Official Blog (Nov'2004 - Feb'2010) 
  
 Sponichi idol report(Noriko Kijima) 

 K's Garden - Noriko Kijima's Official Agency(Old) 

1988 births
Living people
People from Nagano Prefecture
Japanese actresses
Japanese gravure models
Japanese female adult models
Musicians from Nagano Prefecture
Actors from Nagano Prefecture